STSat-2C, or Science and Technology Satellite-2C, or Naro Science Satellite (ko:나로과학위성) was a South Korean satellite which was launched in 2013. It was operated by the Korea Aerospace Research Institute (KARI), and was intended to demonstrate technology for future spacecraft.

Instruments 
STSAT-2C carries six payloads: the Laser Retroreflector Array (LRA) allows the spacecraft to be tracked with centimeter accuracy by satellite laser ranging (SLR) stations which make up the International Laser Ranging Service (ILRS). A Langmuir probe will be used to determine the electron temperature, electron density, and electric potential of plasma. The Space Radiation Effects Monitor (SREM) will be used for measurements and monitoring of the near-earth space environment. In addition, the Reaction Wheel Assembly (RWA), IR Sensor (IRS), and Femto second Laser Oscillator (FSO) are carried for the verification of new space technologies.

Launch 
STSat-2C was launched at 07:00:00 UTC on 30 January 2013, on the third flight of the Naro-1 launch vehicle, with a Russian first stage derived from the Angara and a South Korean second stage. Liftoff occurred from the Naro Space Center, and the launch vehicle successfully deployed the satellite into at  low Earth orbit, with an orbital inclination of 80.26° and orbital period of 102.14 minutes. The launch marked the first successful flight of the Naro-1, which had previously failed to launch STSat-2A in 2009 and STSat-2B in 2010.

References 

Spacecraft launched in 2013
Earth observation satellites
Satellites of South Korea